Rutland is a county in England. 

Rutland may also refer to:

Places
Rutland Island, an island in the Andaman and Nicobar Islands in the Indian Ocean

Canada
Rutland Park, Calgary, a neighbourhood of Calgary, Alberta, Canada 
Rutland, Kelowna, a neighbourhood of Kelowna, British Columbia, Canada
Rutland, Saskatchewan, a community in Saskatchewan, Canada

Ireland
Rutland, Ireland, an island and electoral district in County Donegal

United States
Rutland, Illinois
Rutland, Indiana
Rutland, Iowa
Rutland, Kentucky
Rutland, Massachusetts, a New England town
Rutland (CDP), Massachusetts, the main village in the town
Rutland, New York
Rutland, North Dakota
Rutland, Ohio
Rutland, South Dakota
Rutland, Vermont (disambiguation)
Rutland (city), Vermont, the largest US city named Rutland
Rutland (town), Vermont
Rutland County, Vermont
Rutland, Wisconsin, a town
Rutland (community), Wisconsin, an unincorporated community
Rutland Township (disambiguation)

Other uses
 Rutland Railroad, which served the New England states of the United States
 Rutland State Airport, an airport in Rutland, Vermont
 Duke of Rutland, derived from the county in England
 Mr Rutland, a male osprey who nested near Rutland Water, England

People with the name
Frederick Rutland (1886-1949), British aviator
Mark Rutland (born 1947), American missionary
Patti Rutland, American choreographer
Rutland Barrington (1853-1922), British entertainer
Rutland Boughton (1878-1960), British composer

See also